Labrosse may refer to:

 People
 Claude LaBrosse (born 1934), Canadian former professional ice hockey defenceman
 Francis Labrosse (born 1979), Seychellois judoka
 Jeanne Geneviève Labrosse (1775–1847) French balloonist and parachutist. The wife of Andre-Jacques Garnerin, a hydrogen balloonist and inventor of the parachute.
 Louis-Joseph Labrosse, Canadian notary and political figure
 Sarah-Jeanne Labrosse, Canadian actress
 Simon Labrosse, Canadian businessman and political figure

 Other
 Labrosse, Loiret, a commune in the Loiret department in France

See also 
 La Brosse